Dolné Naštice is a village and municipality in the Bánovce nad Bebravou District of the Trenčín Region of north-western Slovakia.

History
In historical records the village was first mentioned in 1295.

Geography
The municipality lies at an altitude of 205 metres and covers an area of 3.637 km². It has a population of about 440 people.

Genealogical resources

The records for genealogical research are available at the state archive "Statny Archiv in Nitra, Slovakia"

 Roman Catholic church records (births/marriages/deaths): 1750-1895 (parish B)

See also
 List of municipalities and towns in Slovakia

References

External links

  Official page
https://web.archive.org/web/20080111223415/http://www.statistics.sk/mosmis/eng/run.html
Surnames of living people in Dolne Nastice

Villages and municipalities in Bánovce nad Bebravou District